The Wismar Theatre is located on the site of the University of Wismar on Phillip-Müller-Straße in the Hanseatic Town of Wismar .

Literature
Stadtbibliothek Schwerin: „Was ich von Wismar weiß“ von Jürgen Borchert
Stadtarchiv Schwerin: Wismarer Theatergeschichte durch die Jahrhunderte von Leo Martens (aus der Festschrift 725 Jahre Wismar)
Theater Wismar: „50 Jahre Theater der Hansestadt Wismar“ von Ulf Manhenke

External links 
History at www.ndbwismar.de
Information at www.wismar.de
Information at www.igel-wismar.de

Theatre in Germany
Wismar
Buildings and structures in Nordwestmecklenburg